Kai Besar (Great Kai Island, also Nuhu Yuut or Nusteen)  is one of the Kai Islands which are part of the Maluku Islands, Indonesia. The other main island in the Kai Islands group is Kai Kecil (Little Kai Island). The northern tip is called Tanjung Borang, and southern tip called Tanjung Weduar.

References

External links 
 

Kai Islands
Islands of the Maluku Islands
Landforms of Maluku (province)